Neill Byrne (born 2 February 1993) is an Irish footballer who plays as a defender for League Two club Stockport County.

Career

Early career 
Byrne was born in Portmarnock, Ireland. He started his career with Irish sides Portmarnock and Belvedere before joining the Nottingham Forest Youth Academy at the age of 14. Despite interest from other clubs, two years later he signed apprentice terms with the club until 2011. Byrne was released by Forest in December 2011 and joined Rochdale on trial, scoring in a reserve game against Manchester City. After impressing on trial, Byrne signed an 18-month contract with the League One club on 1 January 2012. He made his debut for the Dale on 31 March 2012, in a 3–3 draw with relegation rivals Walsall. In November 2012, he joined Football Conference side Barrow on a one-month loan deal.

AFC Telford United 
He joined AFC Telford United in June 2013 after being released by Rochdale. On 26 April 2014, he won promotion to the Conference Premier with Telford after they clinched the Conference North title on the final game of the season.

Macclesfield Town 
After his impressive season with Telford, he signed for Macclesfield Town. During his 2 year spell, he made 59 National League appearances and 3 FA Cup appearances. He scored 4 goals in the National League and started the majority of games, helping Macclesfield to 10th in the 2015–16 season. In the 2016–17 season, Macclesfield finished 9th in the National League. They also reached the final of the FA Trophy in 2016–17, however they lost 3–2 against York City.

Gateshead
Byrne agreed to join Gateshead on 26 May 2017 until the end of the season. He made his debut on the opening day of the season in a 1–2 defeat against Woking, scoring his first, and only, goal for the club three days later in a 1–0 victory over Guiseley.

AFC Fylde 
In May 2018, Byrne signed for AFC Fylde on a two-year deal. In his first year, he played 44 games in the National League and scored 2 goals as Fylde finished fifth in the table. In the play-offs, Fylde reached the final, but lost 3–0 to Salford City. Byrne also managed to help Fylde reach the final of the FA Trophy, while he did start the final, he was substituted off due to a head injury. Fylde won 1–0 against Leyton Orient.

In Byrne's second season for Fylde, he played 37 games in the National League and scored 2 goals. Unfortunately, his contributions were not enough, as Fylde were relegated after finishing in 23rd. Fylde managed to reach the third round of the FA Cup, before losing 2–1 to, then, Premier League side, Sheffield United.

FC Halifax Town
On 23 September 2020, Byrne signed for National League side FC Halifax Town. In Byrne's first, and only, year at Halifax, he played 40 games and scored 1 goal in the National League. Halifax finished the season in tenth position.

Hartlepool United
On 16 July 2021, Byrne signed for Hartlepool United for an undisclosed fee. Byrne made his Hartlepool debut in a 1–0 victory against Crawley Town. In 2021–22, Byrne played 51 times for Hartlepool, scoring once.

Tranmere Rovers
In July 2022, Byrne signed for League Two club Tranmere Rovers for an undisclosed fee.

Stockport County
On 6 January 2023, Byrne signed for League Two rivals Stockport County for an undisclosed fee on a deal until the end of the season. The move would see Byrne play under manager Dave Challinor for a third time having also worked with him at AFC Fylde and Hartlepool United.

Career statistics

Honours
Macclesfield Town
FA Trophy runner-up: 2016–17

AFC Fylde
FA Trophy: 2018–19

References

External links

1993 births
Living people
People from Portmarnock
Sportspeople from Fingal
Republic of Ireland association footballers
Republic of Ireland youth international footballers
Association football defenders
Nottingham Forest F.C. players
Rochdale A.F.C. players
Barrow A.F.C. players
AFC Telford United players
Macclesfield Town F.C. players
Gateshead F.C. players
AFC Fylde players
FC Halifax Town players
Hartlepool United F.C. players
Tranmere Rovers F.C. players
Stockport County F.C. players
English Football League players
National League (English football) players
Belvedere F.C. players